Ramona Elsener (born 27 February 1992) is a Swiss ice dancer. With former partner Florian Roost, she is the 2010–2014 Swiss national champion.

Elsener/Roost teamed up in 2005. They began appearing in international junior events in 2007. They were sent to five World Junior Championships and achieved their best result, 14th, in 2011. They also competed at five European Championships and three World Championships. In May 2014, Roost decided to retire from competition.

Programs 
(with Roost)

Competitive highlights
(with Roost)

References

External links 

 
 

Swiss female ice dancers
1992 births
Living people
People from Bülach